Moingona is an unincorporated community in Boone County, in the U.S. state of Iowa.

History
Moingona got its start in 1866, when the Chicago and Northwestern Railroad was extended to that point. The community derives its name from the Moingona Indians. A post office was established at Moingona in 1867, and remained in operation until it was discontinued in 1928.

Notable people

 Kate Shelley, a local heroine and namesake of the Kate Shelley High Bridge

References

Unincorporated communities in Boone County, Iowa
Unincorporated communities in Iowa
1866 establishments in Iowa